Lukino is a rural locality (a village) in Vereshchaginsky District, Perm Krai, Russia. The population was 26 as of 2010.

Geography 
Lukino is located 29 km west of Vereshchagino (the district's administrative centre) by road. Leushkanovo is the nearest rural locality.

References 

Rural localities in Vereshchaginsky District